The 2015 Toray Pan Pacific Open was a women's tennis tournament played on outdoor hard courts. It was the 32nd edition of the Pan Pacific Open, and part of the Premier Series of the 2015 WTA Tour. It took place at the Ariake Coliseum in Tokyo, Japan, on 21–27 September 2015. Agnieszka Radwańska won the singles title.

Points and prize money

Point distribution

Prize money

Singles main-draw entrants

Seeds

 Rankings are as of September 14, 2015

Other entrants
The following players received wild cards into the main singles draw:
  Misaki Doi
  Naomi Osaka

The following players received entry from the singles qualifying draw:
  Kateryna Bondarenko
  Ana Konjuh
  Olga Savchuk
  Xu Yifan

Withdrawals
Before the tournament
  Eugenie Bouchard →replaced by Alison Riske
  Anastasia Pavlyuchenkova →replaced by Madison Brengle
  Lucie Šafářová →replaced by CoCo Vandeweghe

Retirements
  Mirjana Lučić-Baroni

Doubles main-draw entrants

Seeds

 Rankings are as of September 14, 2015

Other entrants
The following pair received a wildcard into the doubles main draw:
  Misaki Doi /  Kurumi Nara

Withdrawals
Before the tournament
  Belinda Bencic (viral illness)

During the tournament
  Dominika Cibulková (gastrointestinal illness)

Champions

Singles

  Agnieszka Radwańska def.  Belinda Bencic, 6–2, 6–2

Doubles

  Garbiñe Muguruza /  Carla Suárez Navarro def.  Chan Hao-ching /  Chan Yung-jan, 7–5, 6–1

References

External links